Navasota High School is a public high school located in the city of Navasota, Texas, USA and classified as a 4A school by the University Interscholastic League.  It is a part of the Navasota Independent School District located in south central Grimes County.   In 2016, the school was rated "Met Standard" by the Texas Education Agency.

Its attendance boundary includes Navasota, Pinebrook, Plantersville, Todd Mission, Millican, and Stoneham.

Athletics
The Navasota Rattlers compete in volleyball, cross country, football, basketball, soccer, powerlifting, golf, tennis, track, baseball, and softball.

State titles

Navasota (University Interscholastic League)
Boys Basketball 
1990(3A)
Football 
2012(3A/D2), 2014(4A/D1)

Navasota Carver (PVIL)
Boys Basketball 
1959(PVIL-3A)

State Finalist

Navasota (University Interscholastic League)
Football 
1988(3A)

Notable alumni
Clay Condrey, (born November 19, 1975) former Major League Baseball relief pitcher for the Philadelphia Phillies and San Diego Padres
R. Bowen Loftin, (born June 29, 1949), president of the University of Missouri and a 1967 graduate of Navasota High School.

References

External links
Navasota ISD website

Public high schools in Texas
Schools in Grimes County, Texas